Pitcairnia phelpsiae is a plant species in the genus Pitcairnia. This species is endemic to Venezuela.

References

phelpsiae
Flora of Venezuela